Notable Slovak football transfers in the summer transfer window 2014 by club. Only transfers of the Fortuna Liga and 2. liga are included.

Fortuna Liga

ŠK Slovan Bratislava

In:

Out:

FK AS Trenčín

In:

Out:

FC Spartak Trnava

In:

Out:

MFK Ružomberok

In:

Out:

MFK Košice

In:

Out:

FK Senica

In:

Out:

Spartak Myjava

In:

Out:

FK Dukla Banská Bystrica

In:

Out:

FC ViOn Zlaté Moravce

In:

Out:

MŠK Žilina

In:

Out:

FC DAC 1904 Dunajská Streda

In:

Out:

ŽP Šport Podbrezová

In:

Out:

DOXXbet liga

West

FC Nitra

In:

Out:

ŠK SFM Senec

In:

Out:

FK Slovan Duslo Šaľa

In:

Out:

East

Partizán Bardejov

In:

Out:

MFK Zemplín Michalovce

In:

Out:

1. FC Tatran Prešov

In:

Out:

MFK Tatran Liptovský Mikuláš

In:

Out:

See also
 2014–15 Fortuna Liga
 2014–15 DOXXbet liga

References

External links
 Official site  
 Official site of the SFZ 
 Profutbal.sk 
 Sport.sk 

Slovakia
Transfers
2014